This is a list of National Football League players who lived to the age of 100. For other sportspeople who lived to be 100, see List of centenarians (sportspeople). For other lists of centenarians, see Lists of centenarians.

List

Disputed

References

Notes 

National Football League players
Lists of National Football League players